Formula missae et communionis pro ecclesia Vuittembergensi (1523) was a 16th-century Latin liturgy composed by Martin Luther for Lutheran churches in Wittenberg.

Formula missae was based on the medieval Mass, only replacing the Canon of the Mass. It was not meant to become any rule for Lutheranism in general. Later it was followed by the Deutsche Messe (German Mass), but Luther's Latin Mass was still used for some time after publication of the Deutsche Messe.

Parts
Introit
Kyrie 
Gloria in Excelsis Deo
Collect 
Epistle 
Gradual or Alleluia 
Gospel (optionally with candles and incensation)
Nicene Creed 
Sermon
Preface 
Eucharistic Prayer 
Sanctus (including elevation of the elements during the Benedictus) 
Lord's Prayer
 Pax
Distribution during Agnus Dei (the pastor communicating first himself and then the congregation) 
Collect
Benedicamus
Benediction

External links 
"Liturgies of Luther" article from Christian Cyclopedia
"A Brief Exposition of the Divine Service (archived version)
"The German Mass and Order of Divine Service by Martin Luther, January 1526" (archived version)

1523 works
16th-century Christian texts
Lutheran liturgy and worship
Works by Martin Luther
Christian liturgical texts